Kwadacha Wilderness Provincial Park is a provincial park in British Columbia, Canada. It is part of the larger Muskwa-Kechika Management Area, which include to the north of the Kwadacha the Northern Rocky Mountains Provincial Park and Stone Mountain Provincial Park.

References

Northern Interior of British Columbia
Provincial parks of British Columbia
Parks in the Canadian Rockies
Year of establishment missing